Cerithiopsis anaitis is a species of very small sea snails, marine gastropod molluscs in the family Cerithiopsidae. It was described by Bartsch in 1918.

References

anaitis
Gastropods described in 1918